Schmiedefeld am Rennsteig is a village and a former municipality in Thuringia, Germany. Formerly in the district Ilm-Kreis, it is part of the town Suhl since January 2019.

Gallery

References 

Former municipalities in Thuringia
Suhl